Sir Harold George Hillier (2 January 1905 – 8 January 1985) was an English horticulturist.

In 1921, he joined the family firm, Hillier Nurseries, his early career spent in assisting his father in rebuilding stocks depleted by World War I. He became partner in 1930 and head of the firm on his father's death in 1944, leading the nursery's expansion to become the leading British stockist of northern temperate trees and shrubs.

From the 1950s onward he expanded his interest to gathering seeds and plants from the US and worldwide, donating many endangered plants to collections such as Ventnor Botanic Garden, Wisley Gardens and Westonbirt Arboretum. His own collection, the Hillier arboretum, at Ampfield near Romsey, was presented as a gift to Hampshire County Council in 1977.

Despite his distinguished work, he documented little of it, and his main published work was Hillier's Manual of Trees and Shrubs (1972).

In 1972, he was made an honorary fellow of the Royal Horticultural Society, becoming vice-president in 1974. In 1954, he was elected a fellow of the Linnean Society of London and in 1957 was awarded the Victoria Medal of Honour from the Royal Horticultural Society.

He received a CBE in 1971 and a knighthood in 1983 for services to horticulture.

References

Notes

Bibliography
"Hillier, Sir Harold George (1905–1985)", JGS Harris, rev. John Martin, Oxford Dictionary of National Biography, Oxford University Press, 2004

External links
Life and Achievements of Sir Harold Hillier (1905–1985)

1905 births
1985 deaths
Scientists from Winchester
English horticulturists
20th-century British botanists
Victoria Medal of Honour recipients
Businesspeople from Winchester